The angular correlation function is a function which measures the projected clustering of galaxies, due to discrepancies between their actual and expected distributions. In a homogeneous universe, the angular correlation scales with a characteristic depth.

References 

 Galaxy clusters
Equations of astronomy